The men's tandem was an event at the 1956 Summer Olympics in Melbourne, Australia, held from 3 to 6 December 1956. There were 20 participants from 10 nations. The winner of each heat qualified for the quarterfinals, the losers for the repechages.

Final classification

References

External links
 Official Report

Cycling at the 1956 Summer Olympics
Cycling at the Summer Olympics – Men's tandem
Track cycling at the 1956 Summer Olympics